"Three Blind Mice" is an English-language nursery rhyme and musical round. It has a Roud Folk Song Index number of 3753.

Lyrics
The modern words are:

Origins and meaning

A version of this rhyme, together with music (in a minor key), was published in Deuteromelia or The Seconde part of Musicks melodie (1609). The editor of the book, and possible author of the rhyme, was Thomas Ravenscroft. The original lyrics are:

Attempts to read historical significance into the words have led to the speculation that this musical round was written earlier and refers to Queen Mary I of England blinding and executing three Protestant bishops. However, the Oxford Martyrs, Ridley, Latimer and Cranmer, were burned at the stake, not blinded; although if the rhyme was made by crypto-Catholics, the mice's "blindness" could refer to their Protestantism. However, as can be seen above, the earliest lyrics don't talk about harming the three blind mice, and the first known date of publication is 1609, well after Queen Mary died.

The rhyme only entered children's literature in 1842 when it was published in a collection by James Orchard Halliwell.

Variations
Amateur music composer Thomas Oliphant (1799–1873) noted in 1843 that:

Robert Schumann's Kreisleriana #7, which is arguably about a cat (Murr), appears to be based upon "Three Blind Mice", but in a predominantly minor key. "Three Blind Mice" is to be found in the fugue which is the centerpiece of #7.

Joseph Holbrooke (1878–1958) composed his Symphonic Variations, opus 37, based on Three Blind Mice. Also, Joseph Haydn used its theme in the Finale (4th Mvt) of his Symphony 83 (La Poule) (1785–86); one of the 6 Paris Symphonies, and the music also appears in the final movement of English composer Eric Coates' suite The Three Men. "Three Blind Mice" was also used as a theme song for The Three Stooges and a Curtis Fuller arrangement of the rhyme is featured on the Art Blakey live album of the same name. The song is also the basis for Leroy Anderson's 1947 orchestral "Fiddle Faddle".

The theme can also be heard in Antonín Dvořák's Symphony No. 9 IV. Allegro con fuoco.

The British composer Havergal Brian (1876–1972) used the tune as the basis of his orchestral work "Fantastic Variations on an Old Rhyme" (1907–08). The work was originally intended as the first movement of a satirical "Fantastic Symphony" (Symphony No.1), a programmatic work, based on the nursery rhyme. The second movement was intended as a scherzo for pizzicato strings, depicting the souls of the departed mice going to heaven and the third movement was a Lament for the dead mice. Both these movements are lost. "Festal Dance" (1908) formed the finale, depicting the wild dance of triumph of the farmer's wife in which passing references to the tune can be heard. Having been performed separately, the first and last movements became independent works around 1914.

The theme of the second movement of Sergei Rachmaninoff's Piano Concerto No. 4 (1926, revised 1928 and 1941) was criticized as resembling Three Blind Mice.

A calypso version of the tune with new lyrics by Monty Norman was recorded by Byron Lee and the Dragonaires for the film Dr. No, and is featured in its soundtrack as part of the track "Kingston Calypso". The reworked rhyme alludes to the three black assassins whose deadly march through the streets of Kingston, Jamaica opens the film. Other Jamaican versions include dancehall artists, like Josey Wales and Brigadier Jerry.

In a 78 RPM CD of The Whale who Wanted to Sing at the Met, Nelson Eddy, sang a round of the song before the actual short performance.

The line "See how they run" appears in The Beatles' "Lady Madonna" (1968) and Redeye's "Games" (1970–1971).

In 1969, a version of the rhyme, with slightly changed lyrics and in D minor rather than in a major key, was recorded by Mike Oldfield as part of the duo The Sallyangie, with his older sister Sally, within the song "Chameleon" on the duo's only album, Children of the Sun. In the song, Oldfield sings the rhyme (among other lyrics) as a lower counterpoint vocal to his sister, who sings completely different lyrics on a different, slower melody, in a high voice. Also in the same year, Sesame Street adapted the song to "B is for Bubble".

"Complete version"
Published in 1904 by Frederick Warne & Co., an illustrated children's book by John W. Ivimey entitled The Complete Version of Ye Three Blind Mice, fleshes the mice out into mischievous characters who seek adventure, eventually being taken in by a farmer whose wife chases them from the house and into a bramble bush, which blinds them.

Soon after, their tails are removed by "the butcher's wife" when the complete version incorporates the original verse—although the earliest version from 1609 does not mention tails being cut off. The story ends with them using a tonic to grow new tails and recover their eyesight, learning a trade (making wood chips, according to the accompanying illustration), buying a house and living happily ever after.

The book is now in the public domain.

See also
List of nursery rhymes

References

External links

Complete Version of ye Three Blind Mice – Scholarly analysis
https://archive.org/details/completeversiony00libg/page/n1/mode/2up
Mother Goose for Grownups

English children's songs
English folk songs
English nursery rhymes
Fictional blind characters
Fictional trios
Fictional mice and rats
Rounds (music)
Songs about diseases and disorders
Songs about mice and rats
Songwriter unknown
Traditional children's songs
Year of song unknown